"Fire in the Rain" is a song by Swedish singer Måns Zelmerlöw. It was released on 4 May 2016 as the lead single from the re-issued version of Zelmerlöw's sixth studio album, Perfectly Damaged (2015), ahead of Zelmerlöw's duties as one of the Eurovision Song Contest 2016 hosts. The song was also released as the lead single from his seventh studio album Chameleon (2016). It premiered in a performance by Zelmerlöw during the final of Eurovision on 14 May. The song has peaked at number 31 on the Swedish Singles Chart and at number 3 in Poland.

Music video
A lyric video to accompany the release of "Fire in the Rain" was first released onto YouTube on 5 May 2016 at a total length of three minutes and thirteen seconds. An official video to accompany the release of "Fire in the Rain" was first released onto YouTube on 12 May 2016 at a total length of three minutes and forty-two seconds.

Track listing

Charts

Weekly charts

Year-end charts

Certifications

Release history

References

2015 songs
2016 singles
Måns Zelmerlöw songs
English-language Swedish songs